Henry Howard, Earl of Surrey  (1516/1517 – 19 January 1547), KG, was an English nobleman, politician and poet. He was one of the founders of English Renaissance poetry and was the last known person executed at the instance of King Henry VIII. He was a first cousin of the king's wives Anne Boleyn and Catherine Howard. His name is usually associated in literature with that of the poet Sir Thomas Wyatt. Owing largely to the powerful position of his father, Thomas Howard, 3rd Duke of Norfolk, Surrey took a prominent part in the court life of the time, and served as a soldier both in France and Scotland. He was a man of reckless temper, which involved him in many quarrels, and finally brought upon him the wrath of the ageing and embittered Henry VIII. He was arrested, tried for treason and beheaded on Tower Hill.

Origins
He was born in Hunsdon, Hertfordshire, eldest son of Thomas Howard, 3rd Duke of Norfolk with his second wife, Elizabeth Stafford, daughter of the 3rd Duke of Buckingham. He was thus descended from King Edward I on his father's side and from King Edward III too on his mother's side.

Career
He was brought up at Windsor Castle with Henry FitzRoy, 1st Duke of Richmond and Somerset, the illegitimate son of King Henry VIII.  He became a close friend, and later a brother-in-law, of Fitzroy following the marriage of his sister to him. Like his father and grandfather, he was a soldier, serving in Henry VIII's French wars as Lieutenant General of the King on Sea and Land.

He was repeatedly imprisoned for rash behaviour: on one occasion for striking a courtier and on another for wandering through the streets of London breaking the windows of houses whose occupants were asleep. He assumed the courtesy title of Earl of Surrey in 1524 when his grandfather died and his father became Duke of Norfolk. Being the eldest son and heir to the 3rd Duke, Surrey was destined to be the future 4th Duke. 

In 1532 he accompanied  Anne Boleyn (his first cousin), King Henry VIII, and the Duke of Richmond to France, staying there for more than a year as a member of the entourage of King Francis I of France. 1536 was a notable year for Howard:  his first son was born, namely  Thomas Howard (later 4th Duke of Norfolk), Anne Boleyn was executed on charges of adultery and treason, and the Duke of Richmond died at the age of 17 and was buried at Thetford Abbey, one of the Howard seats. That same year, Howard accompanied his father in the repression of the Pilgrimage of Grace, a Catholic rebellion that had broken out in the north of the country against the Dissolution of the Monasteries.

Marriage and progeny

He married Frances de Vere, a daughter of John de Vere, 15th Earl of Oxford, (by his wife Elizabeth Trussell) by whom he had two sons and three daughters:
 Thomas Howard, 4th Duke of Norfolk (10 March 1536 – 2 June 1572), who married three times: (1) Mary FitzAlan (2) Margaret Audley (3) Elizabeth Leyburne.
 Henry Howard, 1st Earl of Northampton, who died unmarried.
 Jane Howard, who married Charles Neville, 6th Earl of Westmorland.
 Katherine Howard, who married Henry Berkeley, 7th Baron Berkeley.
 Margaret Howard, who married Henry Scrope, 9th Baron Scrope of Bolton. She was born after her father’s execution.

Downfall and death

The Howards had little regard for the "new men" who had risen to power at court, such as Thomas Cromwell and the Seymours. Howard was less circumspect than his father in concealing his disdain. The Howards had many enemies at court. Howard himself branded Cromwell a 'foul churl' and William Paget a 'mean creature' as well as arguing that 'These new erected men would by their wills leave no nobleman on life!'

Henry VIII, consumed by paranoia and increasing illness, became convinced that Howard had planned to usurp the crown from his son the future King Edward VI. Howard suggested that his sister Mary FitzRoy, Duchess of Richmond and Somerset (widow of Henry's illegitimate son Henry Fitzroy) should seduce the aged King, her father-in-law, and become his mistress, to "wield as much influence on him as Madame d'Etampes doth about the French King". The Duchess, outraged, said she would "cut her own throat" rather than "consent to such villainy". 

She and her brother fell out, and she later laid testimony against Howard that helped lead to his trial and execution for treason. The matter came to a head when Howard quartered the attributed arms of King Edward the Confessor. John Barlow had once called Howard "the most foolish proud boy that is in England" and, although the arms of Howard's ancestor Thomas Mowbray, 1st Duke of Norfolk, show that he was entitled to bear Edward the Confessor's arms, doing so was an act of pride. 

In consequence, the King ordered Howard's imprisonment and that of his father, sentencing them to death on 13 January 1547. Howard was beheaded on 19 January 1547 on a charge of treasonably quartering the royal arms. His father escaped execution as the king died the day before that appointed for the beheading, but he remained imprisoned. Howard's son Thomas Howard, became heir to the Dukedom of Norfolk in place of his father, which title he inherited on the 3rd Duke's death in 1554.

Burial

Surrey was first buried in Chapel of St. Peter ad Vincula, in the Tower of London, but some time later his remains were transferred to Framlingham Church in Suffolk, where survives his spectacular painted alabaster tomb.

Literary activity and legacy
He and his friend Sir Thomas Wyatt were the first English poets to write in the sonnet form that Shakespeare later used, and Howard was the first English poet to publish blank verse (unrhymed iambic pentameter) in his translation of the second and fourth books of Virgil's Aeneid. 
Together, Wyatt and Howard, due to their excellent translations of Petrarch's sonnets, are known as "Fathers of the English Sonnet". While Wyatt introduced the sonnet into English, it was Howard who gave them the rhyming meter and the division into quatrains that now characterises the sonnets variously named English, Elizabethan, or Shakespearean sonnets.

In popular culture
Henry Howard, Earl of Surrey was portrayed by the actor David O'Hara in The Tudors, a television series which ran from 2007 to 2010.

References

Further reading
 
 
 
 
 
 with a memoir by the editor

External links

 
 
 "Complaint of the Absence of Her Lover Being upon the Sea" set to music  From the 1990 concept album "Tyger and Other Tales”

1517 births
1547 deaths
Courtesy earls
16th-century English poets
Heirs apparent who never acceded
Henry Howard, Earl of Surrey
Knights of the Garter
People executed under the Tudors for treason against England
Executed people from Hertfordshire
Sonneteers
Prisoners in the Tower of London
People executed by Tudor England by decapitation
People executed under Henry VIII
People convicted under a bill of attainder
Executions at the Tower of London
Latin–English translators
English male poets
English politicians convicted of crimes
Translators of Virgil
Household of Henry Fitzroy